Canelas is a parish in the Vila Nova de Gaia Municipality, Portugal. The total population in 2011 was 13,459, in an area of 6.90 km².

References

Freguesias of Vila Nova de Gaia